Grégory Noel Campi (born 24 February 1974) is a Monégasque former professional footballer who played as a midfielder and striker. He has played for clubs in France, Italy, Belgium, and Canada.

Career

In 2001, Campi signed for Montreal Impact. In 2004, he signed for Louvieroise.

References

Monegasque footballers
Association football forwards
Association football midfielders
1976 births
Living people
S.S.C. Bari players
Montreal Impact (1992–2011) players
Lille OSC players
R.A.A. Louviéroise players
S.S.D. Sanremese Calcio players